Mimulus gracilis the slender monkey flower is a species of monkey flower found in Africa and Australia.

References

gracilis

Plants described in 1810
Flora of Australia
Flora of Africa